Seeming is a musical act based in Ithaca, New York. Signed to Artoffact Records, they have released three albums since 2014. Seeming is primarily a project of Alex Reed, working with Aaron Fuleki.  Both previously played in the band ThouShaltNot.  Reed is associate professor of music at Ithaca College, and previously taught at New York University, The University of Florida, and the College of William & Mary.  He has also written several books on music including Assimilate: A Critical History of Industrial Music.

The Toronto Star describes Seeming's musical style as "cathedral-sized electronic soundscapes consistently whipped to a windblown frenzy," while elsewhere the band is described as "post-anthropocene gothic funk."  Lyrical themes explore evolution, the advancement of humanity, challenging restrictive concepts and rules, the ideals of promoting the greater good over oneself, and the adverse effects of capitalism.

The band has recorded with noise artist Merzbow, rapper Sammus, and witch-house act ∆AIMON.  Their albums have been co-produced and engineered with avant-garde percussionist Sarah Hennies, Daniel Myer of Haujobb, Paul Kendall, Andrew Sega, Alex Perialas, and Bob Power.

Reception 
Pop music critic Ben Rayner of the Toronto Star reviewed Seeming's debut album Madness and Extinction.

Industrial music review site A Model of Control ranked Seeming's three albums tenth, first, and third respectively in their year-end lists for 2014, 2017, and 2020. They later named SOL: A Self-Banishment Ritual the best album of the 2010s, describing it as "a release of towering intensity, belief, and scope". Additionally, they ranked "The Burial" and "End Studies" as the best tracks of 2014 and 2020 respectively, and "Talk About Bones" as the eighth-best track of 2017.

I Die:You Die listed Madness and Extinction and SOL: A Self-Banishment Ritual as their top albums of 2014 and 2017 respectively, and The Birdwatcher's Guide to Atrocity as the second best album of 2020.

Author and journalist Kieron Gillen ranked "Doomsayer" as one of his top 40 tracks of 2017.

The Big Takeover reviewed and premiered the video for "Go Small" from The Birdwatcher's Guide to Atrocity.

Discography

Albums 
 Madness and Extinction (2014)
 SOL: A Self-Banishment Ritual (2017)
 The Birdwatcher's Guide to Atrocity (2020)

EPs 
 Silent Discovery (2014, released on 8-track tape) 
 Worldburners (2015) 
 Faceless (2017)
 Talk About Bones (2017)
 Monster (2020)

References

External links 
 Official homepage
 Official Bandcamp site
 
 

Rock music groups from New York (state)